Roni Hirvonen (born 10 January 2002) is a Finnish professional ice hockey player who is currently playing for HIFK in the Liiga on loan as a prospect to the Toronto Maple Leafs of the National Hockey League (NHL). He was drafted 59th overall by the Maple Leafs in the 2020 NHL Entry Draft, ranking within the top ten of European skaters of the NHL Central Scouting Bureau.

Playing career
Following his third year in the Liiga, posting 9 goals and 26 points through 46 games in the 2021–22 season, Hirvonen was signed to a future three-year, entry-level contract with draft club, the Toronto Maple Leafs, on 13 May 2022.

Career statistics

Regular season and playoffs

International

References

External links

2002 births
Living people
Ässät players
Finnish ice hockey centres
HIFK (ice hockey) players
Toronto Maple Leafs draft picks
Sportspeople from Espoo
21st-century Finnish people